From 1592 to 1593, London experienced its last major plague outbreak of the 16th century. During this period, at least 15,000 people died of plague within the City of London and another 4,900 died of plague in the surrounding parishes.

London in 1592
London in 1592 was a partially-walled city of 150,000 people made of the City of London and its surrounding parishes, called liberties, just outside the walls. Queen Elizabeth I had ruled for 34 years and her government struggled with London's quickly growing population. Due to increasing economic and food shortages, disorder had grown among the underclasses in the city and beyond, whom moralist authorities increasingly struggled to govern. A large and impoverished population made up the surrounding liberties, which became the first communities to be hit severely by the plague.

Plague activity in England 
Plague had been present in England since the Black Death, infecting various fauna in the countryside, and known as plague since the 15th century. Occasionally Yersinia pestis was transmitted to human society by infectious contact with the fleas of wild animals, with disastrous results for trade, farming, and social life. Increasing plague activity along England's southern and eastern coasts appeared during the late 1580s to early 90s. An outbreak at Newcastle in 1589 killed 1727 residents by January 1590, while from 1590 to 1592 Plymouth and Devon were affected with 997 plague deaths at Totnes and Tiverton. Plague spread south and north in England's countryside in the early 1590s, contaminating reservoirs of rodents around farms and towns until eventually reaching London in the summer of 1592.

The plague in London

1592
London's first cases of plague were noticed in August. On 7 September, soldiers marching from England's north to embark on foreign campaigns were rerouted around the city due to concerns about infection, and by the 21st at least 35 parishes were infected with the plague. A group transporting the spoils of a Spanish carrack from Dartmouth couldn't get further than Greenwich due to the outbreak in London and news of the plague had spread regionally. London's theaters, which had been temporarily closed by city authorities since a riot in June, had their shutdown orders extended to 29 December by the government. Members of the aristocratic class sensed danger as the disease continued to spread and fled the city: "The plague is so sore that none of worth stay about these places" remarked one contemporary. In November, London's College of Physicians convened a meeting to discuss the "insolent and illicit practice" of London's unlicensed medical physicians with the intention to "summon them all" before the college for quackery. Queen Elizabeth's royal court also decided not to host the annual Accession Day tilt celebrations for the month due to the possibility of contagion at the royal court.

Some records of the plague were copied by John Stow during his own research in the 17th century and have survived time despite the original documents being lost. Around 2,000 Londoners died of plague between August 1592 and January 1593. The Company of Parish Clerks began regularly keeping and publishing records of plague mortality on 21 December 1592. Government orders forbidding performances at theaters were again extended, into 1593.

1593

Death and infection rates rose steadily during the winter months, even though low temperatures often slow down flea activity during plague epidemics. This was seen as ominous by Londoners observing the epidemic. More resourceful, upper-class individuals continued fleeing during 1593 as the government's countermeasures proved ineffective due to the disease-harboring conditions in some areas of London. Poorer, unsanitary parishes and neighborhoods were located near the city wall and River Thames while the Fleet Ditch area of London, around Fleet Prison, became the most heavily infected part of the city. A prisoner named William Cecil (not to be confused with Lord Burghley), kept in Fleet Prison by Queen Elizabeth's command, wrote that by 6 April 1593 "The place where [William] lies is a congregation of the unwholesome smells of the town, and the season contagious, so many have died of the plague." Government letters indicated that the plague was "very hot" in London by 12 June and that the queen's royal court "was out in places, and a great part of the household is cut off." By August Queen Elizabeth's royal court had evacuated to Windsor Castle in order to escape the increasingly dangerous outbreak in London. The city's sugar refineries continued their business unabated even though public houses and theaters remained closed on government orders to halt the spread of infection.

Alarm was raised at Windsor by the death of Queen Elizabeth's chambermaid Lady Scrope from plague on the 21 August within the castle, which almost sent the royal court fleeing a second time. But the government remained at Windsor Castle through November where Queen Elizabeth hosted her tilt celebrations.

References

Second plague pandemic
1592 in England
1593 in England
16th-century deaths from plague (disease)
16th-century epidemics
Death in London
Health in London
1592 disasters
1593 disasters
Disease outbreaks in England